Lomax was an English alternative rock band from London, England.

The band released three singles and an album on the London-based independent record label, 93 Records. The album, A Symbol of Modern Living (2003), was praised by the Guardian and Drowned in Sound, among others.

Nowadays, their vocalist/guitarist Paul Epworth works predominantly as a record producer, though enjoys working as a DJ. Meade is working on a solo entity, entitled The Sex Act, with a single "Builders of Men/Modern Dance" released on Destructible Records. Schultzberg is also working on solo material.

Members
Paul Epworth - lead vocals and guitar
Jon Meade - bass and backing vocals
Robert Schultzberg - drums

Albums
A Symbol Of Modern Living
Release date: 10 Nov. 2003
Produced by Lomax
CD (93CD02), LP (93LP02):
"The Bodies Of Journalists"
"Brought To Rights"
"Arnstein’s Ladder"
"When The Pressure’s On"
"Anglicized"
"Modern Life"
"Knuckleheads"
"Principles"
"An End"
"Reiterator"

Singles
"Anglicized" / "Last Meal For Jeff" (December 2002)
"An End" / "Brought To Rights"
"Modern Life" (October 2003)
"Reiterator" (Phones Mix) - promo only

References

External links
Paul Epworth's homepage
93 Records
Destructible Records
The Sex Act
Jon Meade on MySpace

English alternative rock groups
Musical groups established in 2002
Musical groups disestablished in 2004
2002 establishments in England